The 1992 Cincinnati Bearcats football team represented the University of Cincinnati during the 1992 NCAA Division I-A football season. The Bearcats, led by head coach Tim Murphy, participated as independent and played their home games at Nippert Stadium.

Schedule

Roster

References

Cincinnati
Cincinnati Bearcats football seasons
Cincinnati Bearcats football